Yakubu Chonoko Maikyau  (born 6 February 1965) is a Nigerian legal practitioner, Senior Advocate of Nigeria and founder of Y. C. Maikyau & Co. In July 2022, he was elected as the president of the Nigerian Bar Association.

Early life 
Maikyau was born on 6 February 1965, at Kebbi State of Nigeria. He obtained a bachelor's degree in law from Ahmadu Bello University, Kaduna State in 1989 and was called to the bar on 12 December 1990.

Career 
On 18 July 2022, he was elected as the president of the Nigerian Bar Association after acquiring a total of  22,342 votes, defeating his closest rival Joe-Kyari Gadzama (SAN) who polled 10,842  votes, and Jonathan Taidi (SAN) who polled 1,380 votes.

See also 

 List of Nigerian jurists

References 

Living people
1965 births
People from Kebbi State
Nigerian jurists
Ahmadu Bello University alumni